The cantons of Aix-en-Provence are administrative divisions of the Bouches-du-Rhône department, in southeastern France. Since the French canton reorganisation which came into effect in March 2015, the city of Aix-en-Provence is subdivided into 2 cantons. Their seat is in Aix-en-Provence.

Cantons

References

Cantons of Bouches-du-Rhône